Robert Guillard (October 1, 1919 – January 11, 2013) was a French polar researcher and head of French Antarctic expeditions. From 1947 to 1984 he participated in 44 French polar expeditions to Greenland and to Antarctica. He was head of the French scientific station Dumont d`Urville Station  in Adélie Land in Antarctica in 1956, 1963, 1972 and 1977. In the early 1950s he was an active bobsledder and was member of the French bobsled team at the 1952 Winter Olympics in Oslo.

References
French Southern and Antarctic Lands - Terre Adélie
Hommage à Robert Guillard -12 janvier 2013 
1952 bobsleigh two-man results
Robert Guillard's profile at Sports Reference.com

Bobsledders at the 1952 Winter Olympics
French male bobsledders
1919 births
2013 deaths